Citraconic acid is an organic compound with the formula CH3C2H(CO2H)2. It is a white solid.   It is the cis-isomer of mesaconic acid. It is one of the pyrocitric acids formed upon the heating of citric acid. Citraconic acid can be produced, albeit inefficiently, by oxidation of xylene and methylbutanols.  The acid displays the unusual property of spontaneously forming the anhydride, which, unlike maleic anhydride, is a liquid at room temperature.

In the laboratory, citraconic acid can be produced by thermal isomerization of itaconic acid anhydride to give citraconic anhydride, which can be hydrolyzed to citraconic acid. The required itaconic acid anhydride is obtained by dry distillation of citric acid.

References

Dicarboxylic acids